The 2017 Asia Rugby Championship, or ARC, was the third annual tri-nations series for top-level rugby union in Asia and the thirtieth continental championship for the Asia Rugby nations. The Asia Rugby Championship replaced the former Asian Five Nations in 2015, with only three nations competing in the top division instead of the previous five. The 2016 series included Hong Kong, Japan and South Korea. Other Asian nations competed in the lower division tournaments.

The format of the competition is a double round-robin where the three nations play each other twice on a home and away basis. The team finishing on top of the standings is declared the winner.

Teams
The teams involved, with their world rankings prior to the 2017 tournament in brackets:

Standings

Fixtures

Week 1

Week 2

Week 3

Week 4

Week 5

Week 6

See also
 2017 Asia Rugby Championship division tournaments

References

2017 rugby union tournaments for national teams
2017 in Asian rugby union
2017
International rugby union competitions hosted by Hong Kong
International rugby union competitions hosted by South Korea
International rugby union competitions hosted by Japan
2016–17 in Japanese rugby union
rugby union
rugby union